Catherine Sue Opie (born 1961) is an American fine-art photographer and educator. She lives and works in Los Angeles, as a professor of photography at University of California at Los Angeles.

Opie studies the connections between mainstream and infrequent society. By specializing in portraiture, studio and landscape photography, she is able to create pieces relating to sexual identity. Through photography, Opie, documents the relationship between the individual and the space inhabited.

She is known for her portraits exploring the Los Angeles leather-dyke community. Her work is held in the collections of the Museum of Modern Art and the Solomon R. Guggenheim Museum.

Life 
Opie was born in Sandusky, Ohio. She spent her early childhood in Ohio, and was influenced heavily by photographer Lewis Hine. At the age of nine she received a Kodak Instamatic camera, and immediately began taking photographs of her family and community. She evolved as an artist at age 14 when she created her own darkroom. Her family moved from Ohio to California in 1975.

She later received a Masters of Fine Arts degree from the California Institute of the Arts (CalArts) in 1988. Prior to arriving at CalArts, she was a strictly black-and-white photographer. Opie's thesis project entitled Master Plan (1988) examined a wide variety of topics. The project looked deeper into construction sites, advertisement schemes, homeowner regulations, and the interior layout of their homes within the community of Valencia, California.

In 1988 Opie moved to Los Angeles, California and began working as an artist. She supported herself by accepting a job as a lab technician at the University of California, Irvine. Opie and her partner, painter Julie Burleigh, constructed working studios in the backyard of their home in South Central Los Angeles.

In 2001, Opie gave birth to a boy named Oliver though intrauterine insemination.

At the Hammer Museum, Opie was on the first Artist Council (a series of sessions with curators and museum administrators) and served on the board of overseers. Along with fellow artists John Baldessari, Barbara Kruger and Ed Ruscha, Opie served as member on the board for the Museum of Contemporary Art, Los Angeles. In 2012, she and the others resigned; however, they joined the museum's 14-member search committee for a new director after Jeffrey Deitch's resignation in 2013. Opie returned in support of the museum's new director, Philippe Vergne, in 2014. She was also on the board of the Andy Warhol Foundation.

Along with Richard Hawkins, Opie curated a selection of work by the late artist, Tony Greene, at the 2014 Whitney Biennial, in New York.

Work

Art

Opie's work is characterized by a combination of formal concerns, a variety of printing technologies, references to art history, and social/political commentary. It demonstrates a mix between traditional photography and unconventional subjects. For example, she explores abstraction in the landscape vis-a-vis the placement of the horizon line in the Icehouses (2001) and Surfers (2003) series. She has printed photographs using Chronochrome, Iris prints, Polaroids, and silver photogravure. Examples of art history references include the use of bright color backgrounds in portraits which reference the work of Hans Holbein and the full body frontal portraits that reference August Sander. Opie also depicts herself with her son in the traditional pose of Madonna and child in Self Portrait/Nursing (2004).

Opie first came to be known with Being and Having (1991) and Portraits (1993–1997), which portray queer communities in Los Angeles and San Francisco. Being and Having looks at the outward portrayal of masculinity and is a reference to 17th-century Old Master portraiture. It conveyed strong ideals and perceptions based among persons of the LGBT community, referencing gender, age, race and identity; all constructed surrounding identity. This body of work similarly plays with performative aspects and play. These works read as iconography, themselves.

Use of certain symbols in her works have allowed these portraits to sit separately from any of her previous works. The portraits, for instance, Self Portrait/Pervert (1994) uses blood. The symbolism used in this work is recognized as a reoccurring statement for Opie, personally and allegorically. These images convey symbolic references to the celebration, embracing and remembrance of the shift and personal relationship with one's body. Opie's use of blood is also seen in another work, entitled, Self-portrait/Cutting (1993).

Opie's earlier work relies more heavily on documentary photography as opposed to allegorical, yet still provides a stark relationship to her investigation and use of powerful iconography throughout the years.

A common social/political theme in her work is the concept of community. Opie has investigated aspects of community, making portraits of many groups including LGBT community; surfers; and most recently high school football players. Opie is interested in how identities are shaped by our surrounding architecture. Her work is informed by her identity as an out lesbian. Her works balance personal and political. Her assertive portraits bring queers to a forefront that is normally silenced by societal norms. Her work also explores how the idea of family varies between straight and LGBTQ communities. Opie highlights that LGBTQ households often base their families in close friendships and community while straight families focus on their individual family.

Opie has referenced problems of visibility; where the reference to Renaissance paintings in her images declare the individuals as saints or characters. Opie's portraits document, celebrate and protect the community and individuals in which she photographs. In Portraits (1993–1997) she presents a variety of identities among the queer community such as drag kings, cross dressers, and F-to-M transexuals.

This Los Angeles-focused series sparked her ongoing project American Cities (1997–present) which is a collection of panoramic black-and-white photographs of quintessential American cities. This series is similar to an earlier work of hers, Domestic (1995–1998) which documented her 2-month RV road trip, portraying lesbian families engaging in everyday house-hold activities across the country.

Drawing inspiration from transgressive photography of Robert Mapplethorpe, Nan Goldin, and sex radicals, who provided a space for liberals and feminists, Opie has also explored controversial topics and imagery in her work. In her O folio—6 photogravures from 1999—Opie photographed S-M porn images she took earlier for On Our Backs, but as extreme close-ups.

In 2011 Opie photographed the home of the actress Elizabeth Taylor in Bel Air, Los Angeles. Taylor died during the project, and never met Opie. Opie took 3,000 images for the project; 129 comprised the completed study. The resultant images were published as 700 Nimes Road. Collector Daily noted the "relentless femininity of Taylor's taste" in the images contrasted with Opie's self declared "identity as a butch woman" in Opie's forward to 700 Nimes Road and Opie's "status as an ordinary mortal" in comparison to Taylor's stardom.

Opie's first film The Modernist (2017) is a tribute to French filmmaker Chris Marker's 1962 classic La Jetée. Composed of 800 still images, the film features Pig Pen (aka Stosh Fila)—a genderqueer performance artist—as the protagonist. The Modernist has been described as an ode to the city in which it takes place, Los Angeles, but it is also seen as questioning the legacy of modernism in America. The twenty-two-minute film, in summary, is about an aggravated artist who just wants his own homes as he has fallen in love with the architecture of Los Angeles. Being unable to purchase a place to live, the performance artist goes around burning down lovely architecture of LA.

Teaching
Opie's teaching career began in 2001 at University of California, Los Angeles (UCLA). In 2019, UCLA announced Opie as the university’s inaugural endowed chair in the art department, a position underwritten by a $2-million gift from philanthropists Lynda and Stewart Resnick.

Publications
Freeways. Museum of Contemporary Art, Los Angeles
 Catherine Opie, essays by Kate Bush, Joshua Decter & Russell Ferguson. The Photographers' Gallery, London.
 Catherine Opie: In Between Here and There.  Saint Louis, MO: Saint Louis Art Museum, 2000. With an essay by Rochelle Steiner. Exhibition catalogue.
 Catherine Opie. The Photographers' Gallery, London, 2000.
Catherine Opie: Skyways and Ice Houses. Walker Art Center 2002.
 1999 / In and Around Home. The Aldrich Contemporary Museum of Art, Ridgefield, CT, and the Orange County Museum of Art, Newport Beach, CA, 2006.
 Chicago (American Cities), curated by Elizabeth T.A. Smith, published by Museum of Contemporary Art, Chicago, 2006.
 Catherine Opie: An American Photographer. Guggenheim Museum, New York, NY, 2008. 
 "Catherine Opie" This is Not to be Looked At. Morse, Rebecca. Museum of Contemporary Art, Los Angeles, CA, 2008.
 Catherine Opie: Empty and Full, Molesworth, Helen, ed. Hatje Cantz, Stuttgart, 2011. 
 700 Nimes Road, Catherine Opie, with essays by Hilton Als, Ingrid Sischy, Prestel, Munich, 2015. 
 Catherine Opie: Keeping an Eye on the World. Buchhandlung Walter König, König, 2017.
 Catherine Opie, with essays by Hilton Als, Douglas Fogle, Helen Molesworth, Elizabeth A.T. Smith, interview by Charlotte Cotton, Phaidon Press, New York, 2021.

Exhibitions

Solo exhibitions
Catherine Opie, The Photographers' Gallery, London; Museum of Contemporary Art, Chicago.
Catherine Opie: American Photographer, Guggenheim Museum, New York City, September 26, 2008 – January 7, 2009. It included an encyclopedic exhibition catalogue of all of Opie's almost 200 works since 1988, loosely divided into two sections: portraits and landscapes.
Somewhere in the Middle, 2011. Permanent installation in the Hillcrest Hospital Cleveland Clinic. The original work was created to engage hospital visitors, employees, and patients during difficult moments in their life.
Catherine Opie: Empty and Full, Institute of Contemporary Art, Boston, 2011.
Catherine Opie: Portraits and Landscapes, Wexner Center for the Arts, Columbus, 2015.
Catherine Opie: 700 Nimes Road, The Museum of Contemporary Art, Los Angeles, 2016.
Catherine Opie: The Modernist. Regen Projects, Los Angeles, 2018.
Catherine Opie—Keeping an Eye on the World, Henie Onstad Kunstsenter, October 6, 2017 – January 7, 2018.

Group exhibitions
Kiss My Genders. Hayward Gallery, Southbank Centre, London, 2019. Opie's work is featured alongside photographic, video, and installation works by Holly Falconer, Peter Hujar, and Del LaGrace Volcano.

Collections 
Opie's work is held in the following permanent collections:
 Museum of Modern Art, New York: 7 works (as of 10 November 2021)
 Solomon R. Guggenheim Museum, New York: 6 prints (as of 10 November 2021)

Awards
 Citibank Private Bank Emerging Artist Award (1997) 
CalArts Alpert Award in the Arts (2003)
Larry Aldrich Award (2004)
United States Artists Fellowship (2006)
 Women's Caucus for Art: President's Award for Lifetime Achievement (2009)
 Archives of American Art Medal (2016)
 National Academy member (2016)
 Guggenheim Fellowship from the John Simon Guggenheim Memorial Foundation (2019)

In popular culture
Her name appears in the lyrics of the Le Tigre song "Hot Topic."

References

External links
Biography at UCLA 
Artslant review of Opie's high school football 
Opie in Lacanian Ink 27
Opie interview with Megan Driscoll in Port, 2011
Opie interview with Kyle Fitzpatrick, in Los Angeles I'm Yours, 2012
Opie interview with Russell Ferguson, Index Magazine, 1996
Opie and the Guggenheim

Links to Works 

 Self-Portrait/Pervert by Catherine Opie
 Dyke by Catherine Opie
 Self Portrait/Nursing by Catherine Opie
 Lawrence by Catherine Opie
 Being and Having by Catherine Opie
 Joanne, Betsy, & Olivia, Bayside, New York by Catherine Opie
 Melissa & Lake, Durham, North Carolina by Catherine Opie
 Pig Pen (tattoos) by Catherine Opie

External links

American contemporary artists
Landscape photographers
Photographers from California
American portrait photographers
1961 births
Living people
Photographers from Los Angeles
LGBT people from California
LGBT people from Ohio
People from Sandusky, Ohio
California Institute of the Arts alumni
San Francisco Art Institute alumni
UCLA School of the Arts and Architecture faculty
People from West Adams, Los Angeles
20th-century American photographers
21st-century American photographers
20th-century American women photographers
21st-century American women photographers
American women academics
Photographers from Ohio
American LGBT photographers
Lesbian academics
21st-century American LGBT people
American lesbian artists